Charles John Robertson (1798-1830), was an English botanical illustrator  who lived at Worton House, Isleworth, and was a member of the RSA. He produced illustrations for the Botanical Register and for Transactions of the Royal Horticultural Society of London.

External links
Some illustrations

References

Botanical illustrators